Abdul Ahad Vakil (February 1934 – 9 July 2014) was an Indian politician and the Member of parliament elected in 6th Lok Sabha elections from Jammu and Kashmir's Baramulla constituency. He served as the state minister in 1983 and the speaker of Jammu and Kashmir Legislative Assembly in 1996. He was the senior member of National Conference.

Life and background 
Vakil was born in Jammu and Kashmir's Sopora district in February 1934. He did Masters of Arts and Bachelor of Laws during his education period and was initially studying at Amar Singh College, Srinagar and later, moved to Aligarh Muslim University where He completed further studies.

Vakil was originally a lawyer in 1971 and then nominated the member of the District Development Board in 1976.

Social activities
Vakil was regarded as the active social worker who was responsible for the establishment of Government Degree College for Women, Sopore  with science up to Bachelor of Science. During his political spanning, He opened several welfare centres for poor, Widows and physically disabled people in Sopor.

Personal life 
The son of Haji Abdul Razaq, he was married to Maryam Jan in 1960, with whom he had one son and three daughters.

Death
Vakil died at the age of 79 at his residence LD Colony, Goripora. He then was admitted in Sher-i-Kashmir Institute of Medical Sciences for medical treatment. After subsequently discharged, He breathed his last after multiple organ failure and chest ailment which is associated with Respiratory disease.

References 

1934 births
2014 deaths
India MPs 1977–1979
Kashmiri people
People from Sopore
People from Baramulla district
Speakers of the Jammu and Kashmir Legislative Assembly
Jammu & Kashmir National Conference politicians